Antony and Cleopatra is a 1908 film directed by J. Stuart Blackton and Charles Kent and starring Maurice Costello and Florence Lawrence in the title roles, based on William Shakespeare's play of the same name. It was the first film to dramatize the ill-fated romance between Mark Antony and Cleopatra VII of Egypt.

Cast
 Maurice Costello as Marc Antony
 Florence Lawrence: Cleopatra 
 William V. Ranous: Octavius Caesar 
 Betty Kent: Cleopatra 
 William Phillips: Octavius Caesar 
 Charles Chapman: Mark Antony

References

External links
 

1908 films
Films based on Antony and Cleopatra
American black-and-white films
American silent short films
Vitagraph Studios short films
Films directed by J. Stuart Blackton
1908 drama films
1908 short films
Silent American drama films
Depictions of Augustus on film
1900s English-language films
1900s American films
Silent war films